Hlaingbwe Township (Phlone ;) is a township of Hpa-an District in the Kayin State of Myanmar. Hlaingbwe township is the third largest township in Karen State and its population was 265,883 in 2014. The principal town is Hlaingbwe.

References and citation

Townships of Kayin State